Our Lady of the Bay Catholic High School is a high school in Collingwood, Ontario, Canada administered by the Simcoe Muskoka Catholic District School Board. The school has about 480 students from Collingwood, Wasaga Beach and Clearview Township. The current principal is Kerri Parent and the vice principal is Denis Nugent.

The school, located at 160 Collins St. in Collingwood Ontario, was formerly named Jean Vanier Catholic High School in honour of Jean Vanier but was renamed in 2020 following the posthumous report of  his involvement in abusive sexual relationships.

See also
List of high schools in Ontario

References

Collingwood, Ontario
High schools in Simcoe County
Educational institutions established in 1985
1985 establishments in Ontario
Catholic secondary schools in Ontario
Naming controversies